Eliphalet Oram Lyte (June 29, 1842 – January 3, 1913) was an American teacher and author of grammar and composition textbooks. He is credited as the composer of the tune to the popular song "Row, Row, Row Your Boat" in the publication The Franklin Square Song Collection (1881, New York). It is also indicated that he adapted the lyrics, previously published to a different melody.

Biography
Lyte was born near Bird-in-Hand in Lancaster County, Pennsylvania, taught there in Millersville, Pennsylvania, and died there on January 3, 1913. Dr. Lyte entered the Millersville State Normal School in 1866 after serving in the Civil War and teaching for two years. He became professor of rhetoric and bookkeeping in 1868 and later a professor of pedagogy and grammar before being named principal. He was associated with the school for 44 years before his resignation due to ill health. Credited for the first building boom at Millersville, he designed and directed the construction of the Science Building (since removed), the Library (currently Biemesderfer Executive Center) and the Gymnasium (now Dutcher Hall). He also oversaw the construction of the Model School, formerly Myers Hall and now Charles and Mary Hash Building.

His textbooks include:
 Grammar and Composition for Common Schools
 Advanced Grammar and Composition

See also
 Row, Row, Row Your Boat
 Lyte (surname)

References

 The Book of World Famous Music Classical, Popular and Folk by James Fuld (1966)

External links
 19th Century Schoolbooks
 

American educators
Linguists of English
1842 births
1913 deaths
Millersville University of Pennsylvania